Oedaspis chinensis is a species of tephritid or fruit flies in the genus Oedaspis of the family Tephritidae.

Distribution
China.

References

Tephritinae
Insects described in 1920
Taxa named by Mario Bezzi
Diptera of Asia